The Bandit's Baby is a 1925 American silent Western film directed by James P. Hogan and starring Fred Thomson and Helen Foster.

Plot
As described in a film magazine review, forced to hide in the hills with his horse Silver when he was unjustly accused of murder, Tom Bailey consents to return to ride in a rodeo when he is granted amnesty for one day. He also acts as a judge at a baby show and picks for first prize the baby brother of Esther Lacy, whose drunken stepfather, Matt Hartigan, is the real murderer. Tom wins the race and foils the sheriff's plan to arrest him by riding away. Esther goes to her brother in Carson City, while Tom keeps custody of the baby. Later Tom saves Esther and the baby, the latter by beating a train headed to an unused spur.

Cast

References

Bibliography
 Langman, Larry. A Guide to Silent Westerns. Greenwood Publishing Group, 1992.

External links

Lobby card at www.gettyimages.com

1925 films
1925 Western (genre) films
Films directed by James Patrick Hogan
1920s English-language films
Film Booking Offices of America films
American black-and-white films
Silent American Western (genre) films
1920s American films